Littlest Pet Shop: A World of Our Own is an animated children's television series developed by Tim Maile and Douglas Tuber for Discovery Family. The series, which aired from April 14, 2018 to January 26, 2019, centered on a group of pets who use a magical portal to enter the world of Paw-Tucket. Based on the 2018 relaunch of the American toy franchise Littlest Pet Shop, this was the third television series based on the franchise overall, after the 2012 TV series and the 1995 TV series.

Premise
The series focuses on a group of six pets (Roxie, Jade, Trip, Quincy, Edie, and Bev) who exit the human world they live in often to go through a magical portal only used by them, which sends them to the world of Paw-Tucket, a community made for and by pets. In this world they are able to have adventures, throw parties, make new friendships, and be themselves.

Production
On February 20, 2018, Discovery Family ordered 52 episodes of Littlest Pet Shop: A World of Our Own from Allspark with a premiere date of April 14, 2018.

Characters

Main
 Roxie McTerrier is a hyper, optimistic and loyal Boston Terrier. She cares a lot about her friends, but she can be very naive at times. She likes eating food and having fun. Voiced by Diana Kaarina.
 Jade Catkin is a sarcastic and gothic bombay cat who is Roxie's roommate ever since the latter destroyed the floor in her old home. She is also Roxie's best friend but dislikes admitting it. Her favorite thing to do is sleep. Voiced by Ingrid Nilson.
 Trip Hamston is an adventurous and confident but sometimes goofy hamster. He is also a rapper, akin to his voice actor. Voiced by Travis Turner.
 Quincy Goatee is an easily frightened fainting goat who faints easily. He is Trip's best friend and roommate. In the episode "Pitch Im-Purr-Fect" it is revealed that he isn't good at singing but he is a good tap dancer. Voiced by Kyle Rideout.
 Edie Von Keet is a fancy and dramatic parakeet who is a talented actress. She always tends to be greedy for the spotlight, which is a reflection of her 14-year-old owner. Voiced by Lili Beaudoin, with singing voice provided by Diana Kaarina.
 Bev Gilturtle is an energetic blue box turtle. She tries her hardest to entertain the other pets. She likes trying out various kinds of activities. Voiced by Rhona Rees.

Recurring
 Savannah Cheetaby is a very famous cheetah pop star in Paw-Tucket. Voiced by Bethany Brown.
 Petula Woolwright is a pink sheep who is the main antagonist of the series and the leader of "the snobs". Voiced by Diana Kaarina.
 Sweetie Pom-Pom is a yellow pomeranian who is one of Petula's sidekicks. Voiced by Brittney Wilson.
 Gavin Chamelle is a chameleon in Petula's gang. Voiced by Alessandro Juliani. Juliani also voices Mayor Perrito, a Chihuahua who acts as the self-appointed mayor of Paw-Tucket due to his name being revealed as Mayor.
 Mitchell Snailford is a dimwitted brown snail and another one of Petula's sidekicks. Voiced by Ian Hanlin.
 Mister Yut is a Siamese fighting fish responsible for managing the commerce in Paw-Tucket. Voiced by Vincent Tong. Tong also voices Scoot Raccoonerson, a sneaky raccoon who thinks that trash is valuable, and Austin Goldenpup, an obedient Golden Retriever in the human world, whom Roxie has a crush on and who works for Mister Yut at the Littlest Pet Shop.
 Captain Gilturtle is a blue sea turtle, Bev's uncle, and head captain of the LPS cruise ship. Voiced by Brian Drummond.
 Manny Mouser is a highly intelligent yellow mouse, an inventor. Voiced by Ryan Beil.
 Carmilla Wingbat is an incredibly shy fruit-bat who prefers to stay in the shadows. She has an incredible singing voice and acting skills. She works as a crew member, and later, actress at Paw-Tucket theater. She also has the ability to use echolocation. Voiced by Lanie McAuley.
 Pearl The Salon Cat is a salon cat worker from the shaking dry salon. Voiced by Shannon Chan-Kent.
 Babs Shortpaws is Dawson Daneskit's sister. Voiced by Brooke Goldner.

Episodes

Shorts

"Littlest Pet Shop" shorts

"Late Night Bev" shorts

Broadcast
Littlest Pet Shop: A World of Our Own had its world premiere on TiJi in France on April 9, 2018. The series later debuted on Discovery Family in the United States on April 14, 2018.

The series has premiered on Treehouse TV in Canada on June 2, 2018. It started premiering on Pop in the United Kingdom and Ireland on September 3. It premiered on 9Go! in Australia on October 5. In 2020, the series premiered on e.tv in South Africa. It premiered on Discovery Kids in Latin America and Brazil in July 7.

Reception
Emily Ashby of Common Sense Media rated Littlest Pet Shop: A World of Our Own a 2 out of 5 stars, stating that the series "does little to challenge the notion that it's an extended commercial for the brand," and claims that the stories are formulaic and the characters are mostly one-dimensional."

Notes

References

External links
 
  on Discovery Family

Littlest Pet Shop
2010s American animated television series
2018 American television series debuts
2019 American television series endings
Discovery Family original programming
Treehouse TV original programming
Television series by Hasbro Studios
American children's animated adventure television series
American children's animated comedy television series
American children's animated fantasy television series
American animated television spin-offs
American flash animated television series
Irish children's animated adventure television series
Irish children's animated comedy television series
Irish children's animated fantasy television series
Irish flash animated television series
Animated television series about animals
English-language television shows